The Anthocerotaceae is the only family of hornworts in the order Anthocerotales.

References

External links

Hornworts
Hornwort families